Kut-e Seyyed Soltan (also Romanized as Kūt-e Seyyed Solţān) is a village in Veys Rural District, Veys District, Bavi County, Khuzestan Province, Iran. At the 2006 census, its population was 1,348, in 196 families.

References 

Populated places in Bavi County